William Henry Taylor (1848 – 1916) was an Ontario farmer and political figure. He represented Middlesex North in the Legislative Assembly of Ontario from 1894 to 1904 as a Liberal-Patrons of Industry and then Liberal member.

He was born in Cartwright Township, Durham County, Canada West, the son of William Taylor. Taylor served as reeve for McGillivray Township and as warden for Middlesex County. He was also postmaster at Parkhill. He married Jane Wilson after the death of his first wife. Taylor was a racing enthusiast and died after being kicked by one of his mares.

External links 
The Canadian parliamentary companion, 1897 JA Gemmill

History of the County of Middlesex, Canada ... (1889)
McGillivray Township Remembers, 1842-1992 (1992)

1848 births
1916 deaths
Ontario Liberal Party MPPs